This is a list of the first fifteen construction permits that were granted by the United States Federal Communications Commission (FCC) for commercial FM stations. These were all issued on October 31, 1940.

Background

On May 24, 1940, the FCC had announced the establishment, effective January 1, 1941, of an FM radio band operating on 40 channels spanning 42–50 MHz, with the first five channels (42.1 to 42.9 MHz) reserved for educational stations, and the other 35 (43.1 to 49.9 MHz) available for commercial operation. On October 31, 1940, the first 15 commercial station Construction Permit authorizations were issued. Many of the grantees already operated standard AM stations in the same community, and some had previous experience operating "high frequency band" stations, including high-fidelity "Apex" AM, and experimental FM.

Although educational FM stations received standard four-letter call signs like those issued to AM stations, initially a new form of call sign was mandated for the commercial FM stations, with an initial "W" for those located east, and "K" for those west, of the Mississippi River, followed by the last two digits of a station's frequency assignment (31 to 99) and closing with a one or two character regional identifier, such as "B" for Boston, "C" for Chicago, and "NY" for New York City.

Effective November 1, 1943, the FCC modified its policy for FM call letters, with commercial stations now receiving call signs from the same block of four letter call signs as the AM and educational FM stations, plus the new optional suffix of "-FM". On June 27, 1945, the FCC announced the reassignment of the FM band to 80 channels from 88–106 MHz, which was soon expanded to 100 channels from 88–108 MHz. The FCC provided that, during a transitional period, stations could simultaneously broadcast on both their old and new frequencies.

Fourteen of the fifteen initial grants resulted in operating stations—the one exception was the Brooklyn, New York grant to Frequency Broadcasting Corporation. Half of the fourteen constructed stations ended operations during the FM band's difficult financial period of the 1940s and 1950s, with the other 7, highlighted in the table below in beige, ultimately surviving.

Table of October 31, 1940, assignments

References

Initial Commercial FM station assignments 1940